LTSports or Leadteksports, founded by Leadtek, is a Taiwanese online media and provides the latest local and international sport news.

External links 
  LTSports official site

Mass media in Taiwan